Richard Johnson ( – 13 March 1827 in England) was the first Christian cleric in Australia.

Early life
Johnson was the son of John and Mary Johnson. He was born in Welton, Yorkshire and educated at Hull Grammar School under Joseph Milner. In 1780 he entered Magdalene College, Cambridge as a sizar and graduated in 1784. His first post was as curate of Boldre, where William Gilpin was vicar. After about a year in Boldre, Johnson moved to London to work as assistant to Henry Foster, an itinerant evangelical preacher.

Life in New South Wales
Johnson was appointed chaplain of the prison colony at New South Wales in 1786. This appointment was due, in large part, to the influence of the Eclectic Society and two notable men, John Newton and William Wilberforce, who were keen for a committed evangelical Christian to take the role of chaplain in the colony. Johnson and his wife Mary sailed with the First Fleet and arrived in Australia in 1788. In addition to guiding the spiritual life of convicts, soldiers and settlers in the new colony, Johnson was charged with providing education to the convicts.

At the first Christian service held at Sydney Cove on Sunday, 3 February 1788, Johnson took as his text Psalm 116:12-13:
What shall I render unto the Lord
for all his benefits towards me?
I will take the cup of salvation,
and call upon the name of the Lord.

As Governor Arthur Phillip was primarily concerned with finding means of feeding and housing the soldiers and convicts in the harsh conditions of the colony in its early years, labour could not be spared for the building of a church. Services were held in the open air and even four years later, when Johnson appealed to Phillip for churches at both Sydney and Parramatta, he had no success. Under lieutenant-governors Grose and Paterson, Johnson fared even worse. Grose made vague charges against him and Johnson made many complaints about the treatment he received.

He was given a grant of land where the suburb of Ashbury now stands and worked it so successfully with the help of some convict labour that, in November 1790, Captain Tench called him the best farmer in the country. He planted seeds of oranges and lemons he had obtained at Rio de Janeiro, which later on produced good crops of fruit, and occasional references are found to his having made a fortune by his farming; this is all probability an overstatement, though he sold his land and stock to good advantage when he left the colony.

In May 1789 the Johnsons took into their home an indigenous girl aged about 15, called Araboo or Boorong, who had survived the 1789 Sydney smallpox outbreak. She learned some English and some Western customs and visited the Johnsons after returning to her own people.

In 1790 he and Mary had a daughter, who was given the Aboriginal name Milbah. They also had a son in 1792.

In early 1793, Johnson cared for the ill chaplain of Malaspina's Spanish expedition, Fr José de Mesa, with, according to the expedition's journal, "a kindness, spirit of unity and a simplicity that were truly of the Gospel”.

In June 1793, tired of waiting on the authorities, he began to build a church himself, and by September, at a cost of about £67, completed a building capable of holding 500 people. Even allowing for the difference in the purchasing power of money and the comparative flimsiness of the structure, this was a remarkable achievement. This church was burnt down in 1798. Johnson, with his wife Mary, taught between 150 and 200 school children in this church.

An assistant chaplain, the Reverend Samuel Marsden, was appointed in the same year and arrived early in 1794; and henceforth Johnson had the support of a stronger personality than his own. In 1794 he published An Address to the Inhabitants of the Colonies established in New South Wales and Norfolk Island and, in 1800, obtained leave of absence to visit England. He sailed on the Buffalo in October and did not return to Australia. In June 1802 King in a dispatch said: "I understand that Rev'd Mr Johnson does not mean to return." Practically he retired in 1802, but so late as July 1805 he appears on a list of officers as "On leave in England, no successor or second clergyman appointed".

Return to England and later life
After returning to England, in about August 1801 Johnson took up a curacy with the Reverend Thomas Dykes of St John's, Kingston-upon-Hull. During this time he had opportunity to influence William Cowper, who became the third chaplain to New South Wales after being recruited by Samuel Marsden. In November 1803 Johnson was curate at Bunwell, Norfolk, a position he occupied until he moved to West Thurrock, Essex, in April 1809. In 1810 he was presented by the king to the united parishes of St Antholin and St John Baptist, in London. He never served as a curate at Ingham, despite oft-repeated claims to the contrary. The Richard Johnson who served at Ingham was a different person.

Johnson continued to take an interest in Australia, appearing before the House of Commons Select Committee on Transportation in 1812 and in 1815 he recommended John Youl to be chaplain at Port Dalrymple. He died on 13 March 1827.

In popular culture
Johnson was portrayed by Ewen Bremner, and his wife by Genevieve O'Reilly, in the 2015 TV series Banished.

See also
Journals of the First Fleet
Richard Johnson Anglican School

References
This article incorporates public domain text from the reference.

Further reading
 Richard Johnson - Chaplain to the Colony of New South Wales by Neil K. Macintosh, 1978. 
 Australian Christian Life from 1788 - An Introduction and an Anthology by Iain H. Murray, The Banner of Truth Trust, Edinburgh 1988.
 Peter G. Bolt, "The Case of the Disappearing Chaplain: Reverend Richard Johnson's 'Missing Years'", Journal of the Royal Australian Historical Society, 95.2 (2009), 176–195.
 The state of religion and education in New South Wales by William Westbrooke Burton, 1840. Available on  Google Books.
 Some letters of Rev. Richard Johnson, B.A.: first chaplain of New South Wales, collected and edited, with introduction, notes and commentary by George Mackaness, Sydney: G. Mackaness, 1954 (Sydney : D. S. Ford)

External links
 
Extracts Volumes 1 and 2 A History of Australia,  C.M.H. Clark, Melbourne University Press, Christian History Research
The Original St. Philip's, The Parish Church of St. Philip, Church Hill, Sydney
 http://adb.anu.edu.au/biography/johnson-richard-2275 article from the Australian Dictionary of Biography
 http://acl.asn.au/resources/richard-johnson-first-chaplain-to-australia/ "Richard Johnson – first Chaplain to Australia" at the Anglican Church League website

1750s births
1827 deaths
18th-century English Anglican priests
19th-century English Anglican priests
Australian Anglican priests
Australian chaplains
History of education in Australia
English emigrants to Australia
People from Welton
English chaplains
Anglican chaplains
Clergy from Yorkshire
First Fleet